The 11th Bersaglieri Regiment is an active unit of the Italian Army based in Orcenico Superiore in the Friuli-Venezia Giulia region. The regiment is part of the army's infantry corps' Bersaglieri speciality and operationally assigned to the 132nd Armored Brigade "Ariete".

History 
The 11th Bersaglieri Regiment was established on 16 September 1883 in Caserta. The newly established unit was composed of the fourth battalions of the 1st, 4th and 7th Bersaglieri regiments. Initially the battalions of the 11th Bersaglieri Regiment were named I, II, and III Battalions, but in 1886 the battalions were assigned their traditional numbers: XV, XXVII, and XXXIII. The XI Cyclists Battalion was added in 1910, while the XXXIX Battalion was raised in 1915 to replace the XV Battalion, which had been deployed to Italian Libya that year.

The 11th Bersaglieri Regiment was involved in the First Italo-Ethiopian War in 1895 and in the Italo-Turkish War in 1911. During the latter war the regiment's XXVII Battalion conquered Sciara Sciat, near Tripoli. For this action the 11th Bersaglieri Regiment was awarded a Gold Medal of Military Valour. However the massacre of captured Italian prisoners by Osman forces led to a massive reprisal. The 11th Bersaglieri Regiment also fought in Assaba, for which it was awarded a Bronze Medal of Military Valour.

World War I 

During World War I, the 11th Regiment, then headquartered in Ancona, was initially assigned to various Infantry Divisions until 11 February 1916 when it entered the II Bersaglieri Brigade - first together with the 9th Bersaglieri Regiment and later with the 7th Bersaglieri Regiment. The 11th Bersaglieri Regiment served in Log di Cezsoca, Srpenica, Chiont, and Dogna Valley.

On 2 June 1917, the II Bersaglieri Brigade was taken out of the frontline for rest, but only two days later it had to return as on 3 June 1917 the Royal Italian Army began its Tenth offensive along the Isonzo river. The 11th Bersaglieri Regiment was finally taken out of the front on 7 November 1917. On 3 November 1918 the 11th Bersaglieri Regiment entered Trieste.

During the war the 11th Bersaglieri Regiment's depot raised the LI Autonomous Battalion, the LXVI Battalion for the 17th Bersaglieri Regiment, and the LXVII Battalion for the 18th Bersaglieri Regiment. The 11th Bersaglieri Regiment consisted of the XXVII, XXXIII, XXXIX battalions, while the XI Cyclists Battalion fought as autonomous unit. The XV Battalion left Libya on 28 May 1918 and returned to Italy, where it was assigned on 29 June 1918 to the 5th Group of 2nd Assault Division. For its conduct at Jamiano the regiment was awarded a Silver Medal of Military Valour, while the XI Cyclists Battalion was awarded three Silver Medals of Military Valour: one for the conquest of Monte San Michele in 1916, one for the tenacious defense of Hill 144 east of Monfalcone between 14–16 September 1916, and one for the breakthrough of enemy lines at Revine Lago on 30 October 1918.

During World War I, the 11th Bersaglieri Regiment was headquartered in Ancona, and recruited from Benevento, Cosenza, Ferrara, Gaeta, Lecce, Massa, Milan, and Savona Districts, while mobilized troops also from Ascoli Piceno, Chieti, Macerata, Sulmona, Teramo, and Campobasso Districts.

Besides military operations, the 11th Bersaglieri Regiment's troops also provided disaster relief after the 1915 Avezzano earthquake.

Inter-war 
In 1919 the XI Cyclists Battalion was disbanded and in 1920 the regiment's strength was reduced to two battalions and one reserve battalion. Some Bersaglieri of the 11th regiment were involved in the unsanctioned "Fiume Exploit".

On 7 July 1924 the regiment was transformed in a cyclists regiment and the reserve battalion was disbanded; on 11 March 1926 the 11th Regiment was reorganized and now consisted of a regimental command, a depot, the XV Battalion, and the XXVII Battalion. During the Second Italo-Ethiopian War, the 11th Bersaglieri Regiment provided officers and troops to several mobilized units.

World War II 

On 1 February 1938, the 11th Bersaglieri Regiment, together with the cavalry regiments "Piemonte Reale" (2nd) and "Cavalleggeri di Saluzzo" (12th), the 1st Fast Artillery Regiment, and the I Light Tank Group "San Giusto", were assigned to the 1st Cavalry Division "Eugenio di Savoia".

On 6 March 1941, the 11th Bersaglieri Regiment was deployed to the Vipava Valley and on 11 April the whole division participated in the Axis invasion of Yugoslavia. Within a few days the division occupied Dalmatia. Between late 1941 and late 1942 the 11th Bersaglieri Regiment carried out intense counter-insurgency activity against Yugoslav Partisans. In October 1942 the regiment returned from Šibenik to Vodice in Dalmatia. There it fought in June 1943 in the attempt to clear Zuta Lovka from partisans. The 11th Bersaglieri Regiment was disbanded on 9 September 1943 in Dalmatia after the announcement of the Armistice of Cassibile.

During World War II, the 11th Bersaglieri Regiment included the Regimental Command, the Command Company, XV Bersaglieri Cyclists Battalion, XXVII Bersaglieri Cyclists Battalion, XXXIII Bersaglieri Cyclists Battalion, LI Replacements Battalion, 271st Armored Car Company, and 11th Anti-tank Company.

Cold War 
In 1964 the XI Bersaglieri Battalion was reformed in Sacile as part of the 182nd Armored Infantry Regiment "Garibaldi". It remained the only active battalion of the former battalions of the 11th Bersaglieri Regiment until the 1975 Italian Army reform.

27th Bersaglieri Battalion "Jamiano" 
During the reform the 132nd Tank Regiment was disbanded on 31 October 1975 and the regiment's XXXVIII Bersaglieri Battalion was renamed 27th Bersaglieri Battalion "Jamiano" the next day. The 27th Bersaglieri Battalion "Jamiano" inherited the flag and traditions of the 11th Bersaglieri Regiment. The battalion was assigned to the 132nd Armored Brigade "Manin". Bersaglieri battalions created during the reform were named, with two exceptions, for battles in they had distinguished themselves: the 27th Bersaglieri Battalion was named for its defense of Hill 144 in Jamiano in 1917.

1992-onwards 

On 30 September 1992 the 27th Bersaglieri Battalion "Jamiano" entered the re-established 11th Bersaglieri Regiment in Aviano. On 21 November 1992 the 11th Bersaglieri Regiment moved to Orcenico Superiore, where on 18 April 1997, the 27th Bersaglieri Battalion was renamed 11th Bersaglieri Battalion "Caprera", reuniting all traditions and awards bestowed to the 11th Bersaglieri Regiment and its battalions in one unit, and gaining the tradition of the 182nd Armored Infantry Regiment "Garibaldi" to wear a red tie with the formal uniform.

In the night of 6 April 2004, during the 11th Bersaglieri Regiment's service in Iraq as part of Operation Ancient Babylon, the forces of Muqtada al-Sadr's Mahdi Army occupied the three main bridges in Nasiriyah. Three companies of the 11th Regiment, one squadron of the Regiment "Savoia Cavalleria" (3rd), and some logistic units of the 132nd Armored Brigade "Ariete" engaged in an 18-hours long firefight with the rebel forces. For retaking the three bridges the 11th Bersaglieri Regiment was decorated with a War Cross for Military Valor in 2008.

Commanders 
 Colonel Giuseppe Barbiani (24 May - 1 December 1915);
 Colonel Giovanni Beruto, (3 December 1915 - 13 January 1917);
 Lieutenant Colonel Giovanni Capoani (19 January 1917 - 15 February 1917);
 Colonel Gino Graziani (10 March 1917 - end of hostilities);
 Colonel Vincenzo Robertiello;
 Colonel Guglielmo Mingo;
 Colonel Michele Adabbo;
 Colonel Lalli (1943);
 Colonel Alessandro Guarisco;
 Colonel Michele Cittadella;
 Colonel Fabio Polli;
 Colonel Salvatore Daniele Patanè (2010-2011);
 Colonel Alfonso Cornacchia (2011-2013);
 Colonel Eugenio Dessì (2013-2015);
 Colonel Alessandro Colaiacomo (2015–present).

Current Structure 
As of 2022 the 11th Bersaglieri Regiment consists of:

  Regimental Command, in Orcenico Superiore
 Command and Logistic Support Company "Sciara Sciat"
 11th Bersaglieri Battalion "Caprera"
 1st Fusiliers Company "Jamiano"
 2nd Fusiliers Company "San Michele"
 3rd Fusiliers Company "Nasiriyya"
 Maneuver Support Company "Assaba"

The Command and Logistic Support Company fields the following platoons: C3 Platoon, Transport and Materiel Platoon, Medical Platoon, and Commissariat Platoon. The regiment is equipped with tracked Dardo infantry fighting vehicles. The Maneuver Support Company is equipped with M106 120mm mortar carriers and Dardo IFVs with Spike LR anti-tank guided missiles.

Uniform 
In order to display the lineage of the 182nd Armored Infantry Regiment "Garibaldi", soldiers of the 11th Bersaglieri Battalion "Caprera" wear a red tie.

Notable members 
From 13 September 1915 to 28 December 1918, Benito Mussolini served in the 11th Regiment.

See also 
 Bersaglieri

External links
Italian Army Website: 11th Bersaglieri Regiment

References

Military units and formations established in 1883
Military units and formations disestablished in 1943
Military units and formations established in 1992
Regiments of Italy in World War I
Regiments of Italy in World War II
Bersaglieri Regiments of Italy